James Marshall Thompson (November 27, 1925 – May 18, 1992) was an American film and television actor.

Early years
Thompson was born in Peoria, Illinois. He and his parents, Dr. and Mrs. Laurence B. Thompson, moved to California when he was a year old. He attended University High School where he was a classmate of Norma Jean Baker, later to be known worldwide as Marilyn Monroe. Thompson enrolled at Occidental College with plans to become a dentist, but he switched to divinity studies.

1940s
In 1943, Thompson, known for his boy-next-door good looks, was signed by Universal Pictures. He played quiet, thoughtful teens in Universal's feature films, including a lead opposite singing star Gloria Jean in Reckless Age, earning $350 weekly. During 1946, Universal discharged most of its contract players, so that same year Thompson moved over to MGM. His film roles steadily increased and improved with appearances in The Clock, the lead in Gallant Bess, MGM's first film shot in Cinecolor, and as one of the main stars in Battleground, as a green replacement in the 101st Airborne Division during the Siege of Bastogne.

1950s
At the age of 24, Thompson narrated the storyline in Stars in My Crown (1950). He became a freelance actor during the 1950s and worked for various studios on a variety of pictures, including the horror and science fiction films Cult of the Cobra (1955), Fiend Without a Face (1958), and  First Man Into Space (1959), as well as Audie Murphy's To Hell and Back (1955). His starring role as Carruthers in It! The Terror from Beyond Space (1958) was one of the two genre films that later inspired the plot for director Ridley Scott's 1979 big-budget feature Alien. Thompson also starred in the short-lived (13-episodes) 1959 syndicated science fiction TV series World of Giants. The drama follows Mel Hunter, a U. S. counter-espionage agent, accidentally miniaturized to just six inches in height, who must live in a dollhouse when not on missions.

1960s
By the 1960s, Thompson's boyish looks had matured and his screen persona became more authoritative. He co-starred with the Belgian-born Annie Fargé in the 33-episode CBS sitcom Angel (1960–1961) about an American architect with a charming but scatterbrained French wife, who often got into zany, Lucy Ricardo-esque situations, caused in part by her lack of fluency in the English language. The show was canceled after 33 episodes due to low ratings, despite critical acclaim for the newcomer Fargé.

He also guest starred as murderer Arthur Poe in the 1960 Perry Mason episode "The Case of the Wayward Wife".

Thompson went on to star in two Vietnam War films: A Yank in Viet-Nam (1964), which he also directed, and To the Shores of Hell (1965). The former was directed by Thompson and was shot on location in South Vietnam.

In 1965 he returned to MGM to play the lead in the Ivan Tors produced comedy-adventure film Clarence, the Cross-Eyed Lion (1965). He played Dr. Marsh Tracy, a veterinarian and single father, who is raising his daughter (played by animal whisperer and Golden Globe-winning Cheryl Miller) alone in Kenya. The film was then spun off into the TV series Daktari (1966–1969), in which Thompson played the same role. Since the series was shot in California and Africa, Thompson and his wife made several trips to various African nations to film second unit footage that was then used in the series and in the film The Mighty Jungle (1965).

Thompson also was the host and storyteller for the TV anthology series Jambo (1969-1971).

Later years
Later in his career, he appeared in many television episodes and in feature films such as The Turning Point (1977) and The Formula (1980).

Personal life
Thompson married Barbara Long in 1949, making him a brother-in-law of actor Richard Long, best known for his role as Jarrod Barkley in ABC's The Big Valley. Thompson appeared together with his brother-in-law in the 1955 horror film thriller Cult of the Cobra.

Thompson supported Barry Goldwater in the 1964 United States presidential election.

Thompson died in 1992 from congestive heart failure at age 66 in Royal Oak, Michigan.

Filmography

Film
Thompson's 60+ film roles include:

Henry Aldrich, Boy Scout (1944) - Senior Patrol Leader (uncredited)
The Purple Heart (1944) - Morrison (uncredited)
Reckless Age (1944) - Roy Connors
Blonde Fever (1944) - Freddie Bilson
The Clock (1945) - Bill
The Valley of Decision (1945) - Ted Scott
Twice Blessed (1945) - Jimmy
They Were Expendable (1945) - Ens. 'Snake' Gardner
Bad Bascomb (1946) - Jimmy Holden
The Cockeyed Miracle (1946) - Jim Griggs
The Show-Off (1946) - Joe Fisher
Gallant Bess (1946) - Tex Barton
The Secret Heart (1946) - Brandon Reynolds
The Romance of Rosy Ridge (1947) - Ben Mac Bean
B.F.'s Daughter (1948) - The Sailor
Homecoming (1948) - Staff Sgt. 'Mac' McKeen
Words and Music (1948) - Herbert Fields
Command Decision (1948) - Captain George Washington Bellpepper Lee
Scene of the Crime (1949) - Announcer at Fol De Rol Club (uncredited)
Roseanna McCoy (1949) - Tolbert McCoy
Battleground (1949) - Jim Layton
Stars In My Crown (1950) - Narrator (voice)
Mystery Street (1950) - Henry Shanway
Devil's Doorway (1950) - Rod MacDougall
Dial 1119 (1950) - Gunther Wyckoff
The Basketball Fix (1951) - Johnny Long
The Tall Target (1951) - Lance Beaufort
My Six Convicts (1952) - Blivens Scott
The Rose Bowl Story (1952) - Steve Davis
The Caddy (1953) - Bruce Reeber
Port of Hell (1954) - Marshall 'Marsh' Walker
Battle Taxi (1955) - 2nd Lt. Tim Vernon
Crashout (1955) - Billy Lang
Cult of the Cobra (1955) - Tom Markel
To Hell and Back (1955) - Johnson
Good Morning, Miss Dove (1955) - Wilfred Banning Pendleton III
Lure of the Swamp (1957) - Simon Lewt
La Grande caccia (1957) - Marsh Connors
Fiend Without a Face (1958) - Maj. Cummings
It! The Terror from Beyond Space (1958) - Col. Edward Carruthers
The Secret Man (1958) - Dr. Cliff Mitchell
First Man into Space (1959) - Cmdr. Charles Ernest Prescott
Flight of the Lost Balloon (1961) - Dr. Joseph Farady
No Man Is an Island (1962) - Jonn Sonnenberg
A Yank in Viet-Nam (1964) - Maj. Benson
The Mighty Jungle (1964) - Marsh Connors
Zebra in the Kitchen (1965) - Shaving Man (uncredited)
Clarence, the Cross-Eyed Lion (1965) - Dr. Marsh Tracy
To the Shores of Hell (1966) - Maj. Greg Donahue
Around the World Under the Sea (1966) - Dr. Orin Hillyard
George! (1972) - Jim
The Turning Point (1977) - Carter
Cruise Into Terror (1978) - Bennett
Bog (1979) - Dr. Brad Wednesday
The Formula (1980) - Geologist #1
White Dog (1982) - Director
Dallas: The Early Years (1986, TV Movie) - Dr. Ted Johnson
McBain (1991) - Mr. Rich (final film role)

Television
 
Thompson's 50+ television roles include:

The Public Defender (1954) - Jeff Norton
World of Giants (1959, 13 episodes) - Mel Hunter
Perry Mason (1960), episode "The Case of the Wayward Wife"
Angel (1960–1961) - Johnny Smith
Daktari (1966–1969) - Dr. Marsh Tracy
George (1972) - Jim Hunter
Centennial (1979 miniseries) - Dennis

Notes

External links

1925 births
1992 deaths
University High School (Los Angeles) alumni
American male film actors
American male television actors
20th-century American male actors
Male actors from Illinois
Actors from Peoria, Illinois
People from Greater Los Angeles
People from Royal Oak, Michigan
Occidental College alumni
Metro-Goldwyn-Mayer contract players
Burials at Westwood Village Memorial Park Cemetery